Jacek is a Polish given name of Greek origin related Hyacinth, through the archaic form of Jacenty. Its closely related equivalents are: Jacinto (Spanish and Portuguese), Giacinto (Italian), Jácint (Hungarian) and Jacint (Catalan, shortened to Cint or Cinto following the Catalan tradition of hypocorising through apheresis).
 
The name Jacek might refer to:

Saint Hyacinth (Święty Jacek, Jacek Odrowąż), Dominican friar and saint
Jacek Andrzej Rossakiewicz
Jacek Bąk, footballer
Jacek Bednarek, racewalker
Jacek Bogucki, politician
Jacek Bury, Senator
Jacek Cichocki, politician
Jacek Dehnel, poet and writer
Jacek Dukaj, science fiction writer
Jacek Falfus, politician
Jacek Gmoch, footballer
Jacek "Tede" Graniecki, rapper
Jacek Huchwajda, fencer
Jacek Jezierski, writer and businessmen
Jacek Jędruch, Polish-American nuclear engineer and historian
Jacek Kaczmarski, singer, songwriter, dissident
Jacek Karpiński, computer scientist and engineer
Jacek Komuda, historian
Jacek Kościelniak, politician
Jacek Krupa, politician
Jacek Krywult, politician
Jacek Krzynówek, footballer
Jacek Kuroń, historian, dissident
Jacek Kurski, politician
Jacek Lipiński, lawyer, mayor of Aleksandrów Łódzki
Jacek Łągwa, musician and actor
Jacek Majchrowski, mayor of Kraków
Jacek Malczewski, painter
Jacek Małachowski, szlachcic
Jacek Pastusiński, triple jumper
Jacek Poniedziałek, actor
Jacek Rostowski, politician and economist
Jacek Saryusz-Wolski, politician, diplomat
Jacek Stopa (born 1987), polish chess player
Jacek Wszoła, high jumper 
Jacek Yerka, painter
Jacint Verdaguer i Santaló (died 1902), Catalan poet

Polish masculine given names